Paracompsa is a genus of beetles in the family Cerambycidae, containing the following species:

 Paracompsa flavofasciata (Thomson, 1867)
 Paracompsa latifascia (Martins, 1970)

References

Ibidionini